Nathalie de Vries (born 1965 in Appingedam) is a Dutch architect, lecturer and urbanist. In 1993 together with Winy Maas and Jacob van Rijs she set up MVRDV.

MVRDV

In 1993, together with Winy Maas and Jacob van Rijs, she founded the MVRDV studio (an acronym of the initials of the names of the three founders), which produces designs and studies in the fields of architecture, urban studies and landscape design.

Publications
FARMAX (010 Publishers, Rotterdam, 1999)
Metacity/Datatown (010 Publishers, Rotterdam, 1999)
Reading MVRDV (NAi Publishers, Rotterdam, 2003)
Spacefighter The evolutionary city game (Actar, Barcelona, 2005)
KM3 EXCURSIONS ON CAPACITIES (Actar, Barcelona, 2006)

References

Further reading
 MVRDV 1997-2003 (El Croquis, Madrid, Spain, 2003)
Frey, Darcy "Crowded House" - The New York Times Magazine, June 8, 2008

External links 

MVRDV website
photo gallery: mvrdv projects
Mirador building, Madrid

1965 births
Living people
Dutch urban planners
Dutch women architects
Delft University of Technology alumni
People from Appingedam
20th-century Dutch architects
21st-century Dutch architects
20th-century Dutch women artists
21st-century Dutch women artists